A horizontal integration facility (HIF) is an integration facility where missiles and rockets are assembled before launch.

HIF in the United States

HIF elsewhere
Most Russian, Ukrainian and former Soviet launchers are integrated horizontally, including Dnepr, Proton, Rockot, Shtil' and Soyuz. The Electron launch vehicle is also integrated horizontally and European Ariane 6 would also use HIF to integrate its rocket stack.

References

Rocket launch technologies
Integration facilities